The Bangriposi–Bhubaneswar Superfast Express is a Superfast train belonging to East Coast Railway zone that runs between Bangriposi railway station and  in India. It was later extended to Bangriposi and frequency increased to daily. It is currently being operated with 12891/12892 train numbers on a daily basis.

Service

The 12891/Bangriposi–Bhubaneswar Express has an average speed of 55 km/hr and covers 313 km in 5h 40m.
The 12892/Bhubaneswar–Bangriposi Express has an average speed of 55 km/hr and covers 313 km in 5h 40m.

Route and halts 

The important halts of the train are:

Coach composition

The train has standard ICF rakes with max speed of 110 kmph. The train consists of 13 coaches:

 1 AC Chair Car
 3 Second Sitting
 7 General Unreserved ( From July )
 2 Seating cum Luggage Rake

Railway adds some extra general coaches during festivals based on demand.

Traction

After the electrification of complete route , Now both trains are hauled by a Visakhapatnam Electric Loco Shed-based WAP-7 Electric locomotive from Bangriposi to Bhubaneswar and vice versa.

Direction reversal

The train doesn't shares the rake with other trains.

See also 

 Bangriposi railway station
 Bhubaneswar railway station
 Visakhapatnam–Koraput Intercity Express
 Bhubaneshwar–Visakhapatnam Intercity Express
 Kendujhargarh–Bhubaneswar Fast Passenger

Notes

References

External links 

 12891/Bangriposi–Bhubaneswar Express India Rail Info
 12892/Bhubaneswar–Bangriposi Express India Rail Info

Transport in Bhubaneswar
Express trains in India
Rail transport in Odisha